Bonitz is a German language habitational surname denoting a person from Ponitz (place name of Slavic origin from the Old Sorbian components po "on, through, along" and něť  "fireplace, oven, stove"; therefore a Slavic term for a settlement created by "slash and burn") and may refer to:
Henry E. Bonitz (1872–1921), American architect 
Hermann Bonitz (1814–1888), German scholar

References 

German-language surnames
Germanized Slavic family names